Sir Brian Pearse (born 23 August 1933) is a British businessman, and the former chief executive of Midland Bank in the early 1990s.

Early life
He attended St Edward's College, a Catholic direct grant grammar school in Liverpool.

Career
He started at Martins Bank in Liverpool at the age of 17.

Midland Bank
Sir Kit McMahon (aged 64) left as chairman and chief executive of Midland Bank on 5 March 1991, after Midland was the first British bank in fifty years to cut its dividend (by a half). Midland had a 90% drop in profits to £63m.

He became chief executive of Midland Bank on 6 March 1991, leaving in March 1994, with the former chairman of BP becoming the chairman in June 1991. He was replaced by his deputy Keith Whitson. The chairman Sir Peter Walters left at the same time, being succeeded by Sir William Purves.

Personal life
He was knighted in the 1994 New Year Honours.

References

1933 births
Businesspeople from Liverpool
Knights Bachelor
Living people